Host Card Emulation Plus ("hCE+") is a proprietary hardened security derivative of host card emulation that is mostly used in the East Asian market.

History
hCE+ was developed in 2012 by CardsApp in order to enforce certain security policies such as online credit card tokenization and PIN code entry upon contactless payments.

References

2012 smart cards
Contactless smart cards